The Canon EF 15mm 2.8 was a fisheye lens produced by Canon from 1987 to 2011.  The lens was compatible with all EF camera bodies but only intended for full-frame configurations, as the fisheye effect is much less pronounced with a cropped sensor (APS-C).

In 2010 Canon announced the EF 8–15mm 4L Fisheye USM which replaced the EF 15mm 2.8.

Angle of view
Unlike the Canon EF 8-15mm lens which replaced it, the EF 15mm is a full-frame fisheye lens, not a circular fisheye lens.

This means that it provides a full 180° angle of view only across the diagonal; it does not provide a complete hemispherical view, and is not suitable for hemispherical photography.

References

External links
 Specification

Canon EF lenses
Fisheye lenses